Vesuvius plc is a British engineered ceramics company headquartered in London whose products are used by steelmakers and foundries as well as in the glass and solar energy industries. The company is listed on the London Stock Exchange and is a constituent of the FTSE 250 Index.

History

The company was founded by Isaac Cookson in 1704 as a collection of metal and glass businesses on Tyneside. In 1851 the Company diversified into lead manufacturing. In 1924 it merged with Lock Lancaster and W.W. & R. Johnson & Sons to form Associated Lead Manufacturers. It was first listed on the London Stock Exchange in 1930. In 1966 it was renamed Lead Industries Group and in 1979 it acquired the A.J. Oster Company, a non-ferrous metal producer. In 1982 it changed its name again to Cookson Group (reflecting the name of the company's founder) and in 1987 it bought the Vesuvius Crucible Company, a ceramics supplier.

Sir Robert Malpas was Chairman of the Group from 1991 to 1998, simultaneously serving as Co-Chairman of Eurotunnel from 1996 to 1998. In 2005 the Cookson Group chose to focus on high technology products and emerging markets. In 2008 it went on to acquire Foseco, a supplier to the foundry and steel industries. In December 2012 Cookson Group changed its name to Vesuvius, the former performance materials division was demerged to form a new company called Alent and the name Cookson ceased to be used.

Operations
The Company's operations are formed into four activities: Steel Flow Control, Foundry Technologies, Advanced Refractories and Precious Metals Processing.

References

External links
Official site
Yahoo profile

Engineering companies of the United Kingdom
Manufacturing companies based in London
Companies listed on the London Stock Exchange
Companies established in the 18th century
Companies established in 1704
1704 establishments in England
Manufacturing companies established in 1704